Stephen Bassett (born March 27, 1995) is an American cyclist, who currently rides for UCI ProTeam .

Major results

2013
 2nd Road race, National Junior Road Championships
 5th Overall Tour de l'Abitibi
2015
 5th Overall Joe Martin Stage Race
2019
 1st  Overall Joe Martin Stage Race
1st  Mountains classification
1st Stages 1 & 3 (ITT)
 1st Stage 3 Redlands Bicycle Classic
 2nd Road race, National Road Championships
 9th Overall Tour de Hokkaido
1st Stage 2
2021
 6th Clássica da Arrábida
2022
 1st  Mountains classification, Arctic Race of Norway

References

External links

1995 births
Living people
American male cyclists
Sportspeople from Knoxville, Tennessee